The Xujiahui Center is a complex of skyscrapers under construction in Shanghai, China. Upon its completion in 2023, the main tower will be the fourth tallest building in Shanghai, after the Shanghai Tower, Shanghai World Financial Center, and the Jin Mao Tower.

External links
Xujiahui Tower on Emporis

Proposed buildings and structures in Shanghai
Skyscrapers in Shanghai
Proposed skyscrapers in China